The Maltese Futsal Knockout Cup is an annual cup competition for Maltese futsal teams. It is organised by the Futsal Malta Association, it is disputed by all futsal teams registered with the Association. It is the second highest national honour in futsal in Malta, after the Maltese Futsal League.

Current Formula
The competition is a round-robin knockout competition.

Champions

References

Futsal in Malta